Isselicrinidae is one of four extant families of crinoids in the order Isocrinida.

Subfamilies and genera
 subfamily Diplocrininae Roux, 1981
 genus Cenocrinus Thomson, 1864 -- 1 species
 genus Endoxocrinus AH Clark, 1908 -- 5 species
 subfamily Metacrininae Klikushkin, 1977
 genus Metacrinus Carpenter, 1882 -- 9 species
 genus Saracrinus AH Clark, 1923 -- 3 or 4 species

References

 
Isocrinida
Echinoderm families